The 2009 Asia-Pacific Rally Championship season was an international rally championship sanctioned by the FIA.

Australian Subaru driver Cody Crocker won his fourth successive title, the first driver to do so. Crocker's co-driver, Ben Atkinson likewise wrapped up the co-drivers title. Crocker scored 94 out of a possible 96 points to complete dominate the season.

The Pacific Cup, decided over the first three rallies in the season was won by New Zealand pairing, Hayden Paddon and John Kennard. Crocker won the Asia Cup, held over the later four rallies of the season. Crocker's team mate, New Zealand driver Emma Gilmour finished second in the championship, moving past former champion Katsuhiko Taguchi at the final round to become the first woman to finish in the series top three positions.  Subaru won the Manufacturers Cup.

Calendar
The 2009 APRC was as follows:

Points
The 2009 APRC for Drivers points was as follows:

References

External links
Official website
APRC Live Podcast
APRC News and Video
FIA Asia-Pacific Rally Championship

Asia-Pacific Rally Championship seasons
Asia-Pacific Rally
Rally
Rally